Presidential elections were held in Ivory Coast on 22 October 2000. Robert Guéï, who headed a transitional military regime following the December 1999 coup d'état, stood as a candidate in the election. All of the major opposition candidates except for Laurent Gbagbo of the Ivorian Popular Front (FPI) were barred from standing. The Rally of the Republicans (RDR) and Democratic Party of Côte d'Ivoire – African Democratic Rally (PDCI-RCA) boycotted the election in response to the exclusion of their candidates (respectively, Alassane Ouattara and Emile Constant Bombet) by the Supreme Court.

Guéï initially claimed to have won the presidency in a single round.  However, it soon emerged that Gbagbo had actually won 59 percent of the vote—enough to win in a single round. When Guéï continued to insist he had won, a wave of protests drove him from power, and Gbagbo was sworn in as President.

Results

Further reading

Ivory
General election
Presidential elections in Ivory Coast